Dark and stormy may refer to:

Dark 'n' Stormy, the alcoholic drink
It was a dark and stormy night, the English literary phrase
"Dark and Stormy", a song by Hot Chip